Caleta Gonzalo Airport is an airstrip by a cove off the Reñihué Fjord in the Los Lagos Region of Chile.

The cove is at the mouth of a narrow canyon running south toward the Chaitén Volcano. South approach and departures are hazardous due to close proximity of the canyon wall. North approach and departures are over open water.

See also

Transport in Chile
List of airports in Chile

References

External links
OpenStreetMap - Caleta Gonzalo
OurAirports - Caleta Gonzalo
FallingRain - Caleta Gonzalo Airport

Airports in Los Lagos Region